Demas Dean (October 6, 1903 in Sag Harbor, New York – 1991) was an American jazz trumpeter.

Career
At the age of ten, Dean started playing coronet and also played violin. In high school he performed with Mazzeo's Brass Band and Beatrice Van Houten. While a student at Howard University in the early 1920s, he worked with Doc Perry, Elmer Snowden, and Russell Wooding and went on tour with Lucille Hegamin. He played with Billy Butler, then became a member of jazz orchestras led by Ford Dabney and Leon Abbey. In 1928, he recorded with Bessie Smith. Beginning in 1929, he spent most of his career with bandleader Noble Sissle. After ten years, he left music and worked at the post office in Los Angeles.

References

Further reading
John Chilton. Who's Who of Jazz.

1903 births
1991 deaths
American jazz trumpeters
American male trumpeters
Musicians from New York (state)
People from Sag Harbor, New York
20th-century American musicians
20th-century trumpeters
Jazz musicians from New York (state)
20th-century American male musicians
American male jazz musicians